The Nuestra Belleza El Salvador Universo 2008 was held on May 3, 2008 in the Auditorio ILC Fepade, San Salvador, El Salvador. There were 15 contestant representing departments and the Salvadoran community. The winner will enter Miss Universe 2008 and Miss Continente Americano 2008.

Results

Special Awards

Miss Photogenic - Rebeca Moreno (San Salvador)
Best National Costume - Larissa Aguirre (Cabañas)
Miss Congeniality (voted by contestants) - Maryethe Martínez (La Unión)
Best Hair - Carmen Salazar (Santa Ana)
Best Legs - Rebeca Moreno (San Salvador)
Best Face - Rebeca Moreno (San Salvador)
Miss Fashion - Cecilia Silva (San Miguel)

Candidates

External links
Official Website

2008
2009 beauty pageants
2009 in El Salvador